I Wanna Be Santa Claus is the 12th studio album by Ringo Starr. A Christmas album, it was issued in 1999.

Background and recording
Ringo Starr and musical partner Mark Hudson composed "Dear Santa" and "Christmas Eve" in July 1998 at Starr's Surrey residence. The pair of the songs were recorded a few months later, between 14 and 16 September in the UK. Follow-up sessions did not commence till 8 March 1999 at Whatinthewhatthe? Studios in Los Angeles, where the tracks "Rudolph the Red-Nosed Reindeer", "The Little Drummer Boy", "Christmas Time (Is Here Again)" and further work on "Dear Santa", were taped that day. "Christmas Time (Is Here Again") was originally recorded by The Beatles in 1967 for their annual Christmas record for members of their fan club. Featured on these tracks were Starr, Hudson, Jim Cox and Steve Dudas. Recorded throughout 1999 between Starr and Hudson, I Wanna Be Santa Claus—which is composed of half-and-half traditional songs and new originals—was made in several studios in the US and UK, with their families joining in and including two notable celebrity guests, Aerosmith's Joe Perry and Eagles member Timothy B. Schmit. Jeff Lynne also sings backing vocals on "Come on Christmas, Christmas Come On", "I Wanna Be Santa Claus", and "Christmas Time (Is Here Again)". The final sessions for the album were held on 8 and 9 September at Whatinthewhatthe? Studios, with mixing taking place at A&M Studios, Los Angeles and Sterling Sound, New York.

Music and lyrics
The title track is about spreading Christmas cheer on every day of the year, compared to just on Christmas Day.

Release and reception

Released on 19 October 1999, in the US by Mercury, ahead of the Christmas season, I Wanna Be Santa Claus was not a commercial success, despite its strong reviews. It was re-released on 23 September 2003 entitled 20th Century Masters: The Best of Ringo Starr/The Christmas Collection. Starr left Mercury after they had done no promotion for the album, which in turn resulted in little sales.

Track listing

Personnel
 Ringo Starr – lead vocals, mellotron, bellowphone, drums, percussion
 Ben Labi – guitar 
 Bill Hudson – guitar
 Joe Perry – guitar
 Marc Fantini – guitar
 Mark Hudson – guitar, acoustic guitar, bass, keyboards, recorder
 Steffan Fantini – guitar
 Steve Dudas – guitar, acoustic guitar
 Matt Hurwitz – acoustic guitar
 Jaydee Maness – pedal steel guitar
 Armand Sabal-Lecco – bass
 Jim Cox – acoustic guitar, piano, organ, keyboards, synthesizer, accordion
 Scott Gordon – keyboards, synthesizer, harmonica
 Dan Higgins – saxophone  
 Pat Zicari – saxophone
 Bob Murphy – bagpipe 
 Ian Halliday – bagpipe
 Roger Houth – bagpipe
 Willie Cochrane – bagpipe
 Kalijut Bhamra – tabla
 George Hamer – orchestration
 Various guests – backing vocals

 Footnotes

 Citations

External links

1999 Christmas albums
Ringo Starr albums
Mercury Records albums
Christmas albums by English artists
Albums produced by Mark Hudson (musician)
Albums produced by Ringo Starr
Albums recorded at A&M Studios
Pop rock Christmas albums